The 1998 Beer Chang Thailand Masters was a professional ranking snooker tournament that took place between 7–15 March 1998 at the Imperial Queens Park Hotel in Bangkok, Thailand.

Stephen Hendry won the tournament, defeating John Parrott 9–6 in the final. The defending champion, Peter Ebdon, was eliminated by Parrott in the quarter-finals. This win gave Hendry his 29th ranking title, surpassing the previous record of 28 held by Steve Davis.


Wildcard round

Main draw

Final

References

1998 in snooker